United Nations Security Council resolution 710, adopted without a vote on 12 September 1991, after examining the application of the Republic of Latvia for membership in the United Nations, the Council recommended to the General Assembly that Latvia be admitted.

On 17 September 1991, the General Assembly admitted Latvia under Resolution 46/5.

See also
 List of United Nations member states
 List of United Nations Security Council Resolutions 701 to 800 (1991–1993)

References

External links
 
 Text of the Resolution at undocs.org

 0710
1991 in Latvia
 0710
 0710
September 1991 events